Peter Ffrench (1844 – 1 November 1929) was an Irish politician.

Born in Barmow in County Wexford, Ffrench followed his father into farming.  He served as a magistrate and a coroner, and was selected as the anti-Parnellite Irish National Federation candidate at the 1893 South Wexford by-election, winning the seat without facing an opponent.  He then held the seat at each subsequent election, no opponent coming forward until the 1918 general election, when he lost to James Ryan in the Sinn Féin landslide.

References

External links
 

1844 births
1929 deaths
Anti-Parnellite MPs
Members of the Parliament of the United Kingdom for County Wexford constituencies (1801–1922)
Politicians from County Wexford
UK MPs 1892–1895
UK MPs 1895–1900
UK MPs 1900–1906
UK MPs 1906–1910
UK MPs 1910
UK MPs 1910–1918
Healyite Nationalist MPs